Powellvenator (meaning "Jaime Powell's hunter") is an extinct genus of coelophysoid theropod dinosaur that lived during the latter part of the Triassic Period in what is now northwestern Argentina. Fossils of the dinosaur were found in the Los Colorados Formation of the Ischigualasto-Villa Unión Basin. The type species, Powellvenator podocitus, was named by Martin Ezcurra in 2017.

See also 
 2017 in archosaur paleontology

References 

Coelophysoids
Norian life
Late Triassic dinosaurs of South America
Triassic Argentina
Fossils of Argentina
Los Colorados Formation
Fossil taxa described in 2017